Periodically Double or Triple is a song by American band Yo La Tengo, from their 2009 album Popular Songs. The music video was directed by John McSwain, and features stop motion animation with pieces of fruit, interspersed with close-ups of various people eating fruit.

Reception
Stereogum felt that it was "mellow" and "could have been written in the '60s", while the Guardian called it "strutting, tongue-in-cheek funk". Pitchfork faulted the lyrics as "reek(ing) of a distinct lack of confidence", but lauded the music, in particular the "out-of-nowhere elevator-music break". National Public Radio praised it as a "marvel of spare instrumentation".

External links
Official music video on Youtube

References

Yo La Tengo songs
2009 singles
2009 songs